The New Jalpaiguri–New Bongaigaon section  of the Barauni–Guwahati line connects New Jalpaiguri in the Indian state of West Bengal and New Bongaigaon in Assam.

History
During British rule, all links from the northern part of Bengal and Assam to the rest of India were through the eastern part of Bengal. During the nineteenth century, Lalmonirhat was linked to the Dooars.

With the partition of India in 1947, all these links were lost. Fakiragram was connected to the Indian railway system in 1950 through the Indian portion of North Bengal with a metre gauge track. The New Jalpaiguri–New Bongaigaon section was partly new construction, partly old line converted to  broad gauge in 1963.

Branch lines
As most other railway tracks in the area were metre gauge, the line was converted from  broad gauge to metre gauge in 1949. Then in 1960s when broad gauge was introduced in the area, the line was converted back to broad gauge and connected to the new station at New Jalpaiguri.

In pre-independence days, the line was up to Mogalhat, now in Bangladesh.
 
The Alipuduar–Bamanhat branch line ends near the India-Bangladesh border across the Dharla River.  In pre-independence days, it used to connect to Mogalhat, now in Bangladesh, across the Dharla. The bridge is broken. The line from Golokganj meets the branch line. The  New Cooch Behar–Golokganj section is newly made into broad gauge via Boxirhat.  The line passed through a diffetent alignment.

The  Fakiragram-Dhubri branch line was inaugurated after gauge conversion in September 2010.

Electrification

References

5 ft 6 in gauge railways in India
Rail transport in West Bengal
Rail transport in Assam
 
 
 
Transport in Siliguri
Transport in Jalpaiguri
Transport in Bongaigaon